The Ginetta G61-LT-P3 is a Le Mans Prototype LMP3 built to ACO Le Mans Prototype LMP3 regulations. It was designed, and built by Ginetta Cars. The car is the successor to the original Ginetta-Juno P3-15, which was the first LMP3 Prototype. The car can be built from its predecessor, and is set to be eligible in a series of Championships worldwide, such as the European Le Mans Series, and the IMSA Prototype Challenge. The car was launched on the weekend of the 2019 24 Hours of Le Mans, being publicly unveiled alongside its competitors.

Developmental history 
On 23 May 2018, the Automobile Club de I'Ouest announced a brief outline for the 2020 Generation 2 Le Mans Prototype 3 (LMP3) regulations, alongside new chassis models from four approved manufacturers – Onroak Automotive (Ligier), Duqueine Automotive (Norma), ADESS AG and Ginetta being announced as granted homologation for the new ruleset. On 7 February 2019, the ACO announced the new 2nd Generation Le Mans Prototype 3 (LMP3) regulations, with full implementation due by 2021, and with the cars being expected to be raced from 2020 to 2024.

Styling cues from the new Ginetta Akula supercar was incorporated into the bodywork of the car, while the bodywork was developed by the team who had worked on the Ginetta G60-LT-P1 LMP1 car.

It was subsequently revealed on 16 December 2019, that the car already completed over 2,000 km of testing at several tracks within the United Kingdom, with the car being tested by Ginetta factory drivers, as well as other drivers with race experience in the Gen 1 LMP3 cars, who have also accumulated significant mileage in the other Gen II LMP3 cars.

References 

Le Mans Prototypes